Tixier is a French surname.

Tixier may refer to:

 Scott Tixier (b. 1986), French jazz violinist
 Tony Tixier (b. 1986), French jazz pianist
 Damien Tixier (b. 1980), French professional football player, playing for Switzerland
 Jean Max Tixier (1935–2009), French poet
 Raymond Tixier (1912–1940), French Olympic field hockey player
 Jean-Louis Tixier-Vignancour (1907–1989), French lawyer and politician; 1965 presidential candidate
 Adrien Tixier (1893–1946), French politician and teacher
 Jean Tixier de Ravisi (c. 1480–1524), French Renaissance humanist, author, and scholar; former rector of the University of Paris
 Jordi Tixier (born 1991), French motocross rider